Chief Shaumonekusse (ca. 1785–1837) was a leader of the Otoe Native American tribe in the early 19th century. The Otoe are a Central Plains tribe, closely related to the Ioway, Missouria, Ho-Chunk, and Winnebago.

Name 
The subchief was known as Shaumonekusse, Chonmonicase, Ietan, Letan, and L'Letan. Sų Manyi Kathi in the Chiwere language means "Prairie Wolf." His name is also spelled Sų Manyi Kasisooⁿ and Shųmanyikathi.

Personal 
Sų Manyi Kathi belonged to the Bear clan.
Shaumonekusse was described as a witty and sociable person, and "a daring, active, and successful warrior. We are not aware of his having any hereditary claims to the chieftainship of his tribe, to which he has risen gradually by his own merits. He is a person of deep penetration, and is capable of acting with much duplicity on any occasion when he may consider it politic to conceal his real views."

Career 
"He recounted his deeds in 1819 during a dance performed before members of the Stephen Long Expedition to the Rocky Mountains. Later in life he killed his brother after a fight in which the latter bit off the end of his nose."

Shaumonekusse traveled with an American Indian delegation to Washington, DC in 1821 to meet with high-ranking officials, including President James Monroe. Of his five wives, he took the youngest, Eagle of Delight, with him to the American capital. Charles Bird King painted both of their portraits on that trip.

References

External links
 "Shaumonekusse", Indian Tribes of North America, Washington, DC: Smithsonian Institution, 1910

Native American leaders
19th-century Native Americans
1780s births
1837 deaths
Presidency of James Monroe
Otoe people